Hans Solereder (11 September 1860 Munich – 8 November 1920 Erlangen), was a German botanist and university professor.

Solereder studied biology from 1880 at the University of Munich, under Radlkofer, and was awarded a PhD in 1885. From 1886 to 1890 he was Assistant, and from 1888 tutor in the botany department's laboratory. In 1890 he became curator of the  Botanical Museum in Munich. In 1899 he became associate professor and in 1901 Professor of Botany at the University of Erlangen, where he was also Director of the Botanical Gardens.

Solereder undertook field trips to Texas, California and the Yellowstone National Park. He edited the Dicotyledons according to the system devised by Radlkofer.

This botanist is denoted by the author abbreviation Soler. when citing a botanical name.

Books
 (1908): Systematische Anatomie der Dicotyledonen: Ein Handbuch für Laboratorien der wissenschaftlichen und angewandten Botanik - Stuttgart : Enke
 (1885): Über den systematischen Wert der Holzstructur bei den Dicotyledonen. (Dissertation)

See also
List of florilegia and botanical codices

References
 Ilse Jahn (Hrsg.): Geschichte der Biologie. 

Botanists with author abbreviations
19th-century German botanists
German taxonomists
1869 births
1920 deaths
20th-century German botanists
Academic staff of the University of Erlangen-Nuremberg